The 1963 Gael Linn Cup is a representative competition for elite level participants in the women's team field sport of camogie, was won by Munster, who defeated Leinster in the final, played at Gorey.

Arrangements
Munster defeated Connacht 5–10 to 1–3 in the semifinal at Pearse Park. Leinster defeated Ulster 9–3 to 6–0 at Carrickmacross. Munster defeated Leinster in what was described as an exciting and often brilliant final at Gorey. Agnes Hourigan wrote in the Irish Press: Munster were never led. Three times Leinster drew level with them, but in the end it was Munster which put the stronger finish and won well. Score of the match was a brilliant 40-yard goal for Munster by Rene Manley. Within seconds Clare Hanrahan struck at Munster jubilation by scoring from a free and then she whipped over the equalising point just before half-time. With the stage set for drama Josie Mcnamara had to come off for Munster and was replaced by Joan Clancy. Ten minutes from the end Munster got back the lead for the final time. Kathleen Griffin finished off a clever attack with a hard shot to the back of the net and Munster were a goal ahead. The final minutes were tense as Leinster poured attack after attack on to the gallant Munster defence but to no avail.

Final stages

|}

References

External links
 Camogie Association

1963 in camogie
1963